The Jaguarão or Yaguarón River is a Brazilian and Uruguayan river.
It forms the border between Uruguay and Rio Grande do Sul state in southernmost Brazil.

The river originates in Serras de Sudeste (Southeastern Mountain Ranges) and flows east to empty into Lagoa Mirim (Portuguese) / Laguna Merín (Spanish), which is a large coastal lagoon which is indirectly connected to the Atlantic Ocean.

Navigability 

The river is navigable as far up as the town of Jaguarão. Regarding its navigability, vessels sailing on the nearby Mirim Lagoon are by treaty under Brazilian jurisdiction.

See also 

 Geography of Uruguay#Topography and hydrography
 1851 Boundary Treaty (Brazil–Uruguay)
 Battle of Jaguarão

Rivers of Rio Grande do Sul
Rivers of Uruguay
Brazil–Uruguay border
International rivers of South America
Jaguarão
Rivers of Cerro Largo Department

it:Yaguarón
zh:亞瓜龍河